The Distinguished Career Intelligence Medal is awarded by the Central Intelligence Agency for an individual's cumulative record of service reflecting a pattern of increasing levels of responsibility or increasingly strategic impact and with distinctly exceptional achievements that constitute a major contribution to the mission of the Agency.

See also 
Awards and decorations of the United States government

References

Awards and decorations of the Central Intelligence Agency
Career awards